Howrah metro station is a metro station of Kolkata Metro Line 2 in Howrah, India. Built underneath Howrah railway station's new complex, the metro station allows interchanging with other zones of Indian Railways as part of the Howrah station transport hub. It is the deepest metro station in India. To the east, the station connects to Mahakaran station in Kolkata through India's biggest under-river metro tunnel beneath the Hooghly river; whilst to the west the adjacent station is Howrah Maidan. The station is expected to be opened by December 2023.

History 

The master plan had already identified the East-West corridor back in 1971. It was planned to connect Howrah Railway Station with the Salt Lake region. As per the feasibility investigation for the corridor conducted by Pacific Consultant International Group in January 2004; their plan report proposed the route and tubular structures to be beneath the Hooghly River.

The Kolkata Metro Rail Corporation Limited (KMRC) was formed, to execute the operations of this line.

Connections

Passengers can travel through the Kolkata Metro via interchanges on the rest of Line 2. Further the station is directly connected to Howrah railway station, allowing passengers to access both suburban, regional and long-distance services offered by Eastern Railway and South Eastern Railway.

Gallery

See also
 Transport in Kolkata
 List of Kolkata Metro stations
 East West Metro, Kolkata metro line 2
 Kolkata Metro

References

Kolkata Metro stations
Railway stations in Kolkata
Railway stations scheduled to open in 2023